David Schwartzman (April 22, 1924 – March 28, 2019) was a Canadian-born American economist.

Education and career
Born in Montreal to a Canadian father and American mother, Schwartzman’s first public role was as a national youth organizer for the Co-operative Commonwealth Federation (CCF). Schwartzman received his BA from McGill University, Canada in 1945, and spent the 1945–1946 academic year studying under Milton Friedman and George Stigler at the University of Minnesota. He earned his PhD from UC Berkeley, USA in 1953. He held many teaching positions in economics: Lecturer at McGill (1948–1951); Instructor at Columbia (1954–1958); Assistant Professor at New York University (1958–1960), and Professor at the New School for Social Research (1960–1964), where he attained emeritus status in 2002.

Contributions
Schwartzman made significant novel contributions to the discipline of Industrial Organization (IO). A standard textbook on IO has testified to his contribution in several places. His core contributions are in the areas Economic Concentration—Regionally and locally, Uncertainty and the Size of Firms, The Burden of Monopoly, Black Unemployment, Rate of Returns in the Pharmaceutical Industry, and the Decline in the Retail and Service Industry. We present some analyses of his contributions as reviewed by others in academic journals.

According to Billy R. Dickson, Schwartzman thesis in his book on "Black Unemployment" is based on the microeconomic model of substitution. Here the notion is substitution of factor prices, namely the relative price changes from unskilled labor to skilled labor demand. This analysis was carried out with labor-saving technologies as an instrumental variable.

Sam Peltzman has analyzed Schwartzman’s hypothesis that the return in the pharmaceutical industry was declining from better rates in the 1950s and 1960s. The underlying cause for the decline included mainly the increase in regulation through the 1962 Amendments to the Food, Drug and Cosmetics Act.

Ramrattan and Szenberg analyzed Schwartzman’s analyses of trends in the Retail and Service industries (1969; 1971). The study puts into perspective growth and decline in the book industries. Of importance was slow employment growth, which was a quarter of a percent annually from 1929 to 1958, and one percent from 1958 to 1963.

Some of His Works
Schwartzman, David. (1997). Black Unemployment: part of unskilled unemployment. Wesport, Conn.: Greenwood Press.
Schwartzman, David. (1988). Games of Chicken - Four Decades of U.S. Nuclear Policy. New York: Praeger Publishers, 248 pages. .
Schwartzman, David. (1976). Innovation in the Pharmaceutical Industry. Baltimore, MD: Johns Hopkins University Press.
Schwartzman, David, (1971). The Decline of Service in Retail Trade: An Analysis of the Growth of Sales per Man-Hour, 1919–1963. Pullman, WA: Washington State University Press.
Schwartzman, David and Joan Bodoff, (1971). "Concentration in Regional and Local Industries," Southern Economic Journal, Vol. 37 (January), pp. 343–348.
Schwartzman, David. (1969). Production and Productivity in the Service Industries, in Victor R. Fuchs, ed. Studies in Income and Wealth, NBER Conference on Research in Income and Wealth, 34, 201-230.
Schwartzman, David. (1963). "Uncertainty and the Size of Firms," Economica, Vol 30 (August), pp. 287–269.
Schwartzman, David. (1960). "The Burden of Monopoly," Journal of Political Economy, vol. 33 (June), pp. 627–630.

References

1924 births
Canadian economists
McGill University alumni
2019 deaths
20th-century American economists
20th-century American male writers
20th-century American non-fiction writers
21st-century American economists
21st-century American male writers
21st-century American non-fiction writers
American economics writers
American male non-fiction writers
American political writers
Jewish American social scientists
Jewish American writers
National Bureau of Economic Research
Canadian emigrants to the United States
21st-century American Jews